The 2022 Iowa Hawkeyes football team represented the University of Iowa as member of the West Division of the Big Ten Conference during the 2022 NCAA Division I FBS football season. Led by 24th-year head coach Kirk Ferentz, the Hawkeyes played home games at Kinnick Stadium in Iowa City, Iowa.

Floundering after a 3–4 start, the Hawkeyes won four straight games to position themselves for a return trip to the Big Ten Championship game and repeat as Big Ten West champions. A disappointing season finale at home against Nebraska spoiled those plans, but Iowa capped the 2022 season with a dominating 21–0 win over Kentucky in the Music City Bowl  avenging their bowl loss from the previous season. The Hawkeyes finished with a record of 8–5 (5–4 B1G).

Senior linebacker Jack Campbell was named Nagurski–Woodson Defensive Player of the Year, a Unanimous First-team All-American, and the 2022 Butkus Award winner as the nation's top linebacker.

Previous season
The 2021 Hawkeyes team finished the season 10–4, 7–2 in Big Ten play to win the West Division. The Hawkeyes were ranked as high as #2 after starting the season 6–0. They were beaten soundly by Michigan, 42–3, in the Big Ten Championship Game. Iowa received an invitation to the Citrus Bowl where they were defeated by Kentucky, 20–17.

Several Hawkeyes entered the NFL after the 2021 season, including center Tyler Linderbaum, the 2021 Rimington Trophy winner and first round pick in the 2022 NFL Draft. First team all-Big Ten safety Dane Belton also entered the Draft early and was selected in the fourth round by the New York Giants. Running back Tyler Goodson entered the NFL after his junior season and signed as an undrafted free agent with the Green Bay Packers.

Preseason 
On January 14, 2022, Kirk Ferentz's contract was extended through the 2029 season. On March 2, 2022, Iowa announced the hire of Abdul Hodge, previously the linebackers coach at South Dakota, as its tight ends coach. Offensive coordinator Brian Ferentz took over as quarterbacks coach, after previous quarterbacks coach Ken O'Keefe stepped down. “Man, I got a lot to learn," Brian Ferentz told media about adjusting to coaching quarterbacks after his appointment in May 2022. Former Wisconsin quarterback and Colorado State offensive coordinator Jon Budmayr joined the Hawkeyes as an offensive analyst that would assist Brian Ferentz with the quarterbacks.

During the offseason, two Hawkeye wide receivers transferred to West division rival Purdue. Starters Tyrone Tracy, second on the team in receiving yards in 2019, and Charlie Jones, the 2021 Big Ten Returner of the Year, would both play 2022 with the Boilermakers. After struggling as a starter in 2020 and 2021, quarterback Spencer Petras won a supposed quarterback competition against Alex Padilla and Joe Labas.

The Hawkeyes were ranked second in the West Division in the preseason Big Ten media poll, behind Wisconsin and ahead of Minnesota. Linebacker Jack Campbell was selected as the media's preseason Defensive Player of the Year, finishing ahead of Wisconsin linebacker Nick Herbig. The Hawkeyes received votes, but were unranked in the preseason AP Poll and Coaches Poll.

Kirk Ferentz named Campbell, cornerback Riley Moss, tight end Sam LaPorta, and safety Kaevon Merriweather as captains before the week 1 game against South Dakota State and would remain team  captains through the regular season.

Schedule
Iowa announced its 2022 football schedule on January 12, 2022. The 2022 schedule consisted of seven home games and five away games in the regular season. The Hawkeyes hosted Big Ten foes Michigan, Northwestern, Wisconsin, and Nebraska and traveled to Rutgers, Illinois, Ohio State, Purdue, and Minnesota.

The Hawkeyes hosted all three non-conference opponents, South Dakota State from Division I FCS, Iowa State from the Big 12 and Nevada from the Mountain West. This marked the first season since 2011 that the entire home schedule was sold out. The first game of the season was played against the eventual FCS National Champion.

Roster

Rankings

Game summaries

No. 2 (FCS) South Dakota State

Source: Box Score

Iowa relied almost entirely on defense and special teams to earn a hard-fought victory over FCS foe South Dakota State. The Jacks were only able to muster 120 total yards, in large part due to poor starting field position the entire day. Two such drives ended with the Iowa defense forcing a safety, proving to be the difference in the game. The teams combined for 21 punts for 936 yards. Iowa's Tory Taylor pinned SDSU inside their own 20 on 7 of his 10 punts, earning him B1G Special Teams Player of the Week honors.

Iowa State

Source: Box Score

Iowa State ended a six-game skid in the series. Sophomore Lukas Van Ness blocked two punts and was named B1G Special Teams Player of the Week.

Nevada

Source: Box Score

After enduring three separate lightning delays totaling 3 hours and 56 minutes, Iowa closed out their non-conference schedule with a 27-point win in the first meeting between the schools.

at Rutgers

Source: Box Score

In their B1G opener, Iowa scored two defensive touchdowns in the first half to pick up a win on the road and moved to 3–0 all-time versus Rutgers.

No. 4 Michigan

Source: Box Score

Fox’s Big Noon Kickoff was on hand for this contest. Michigan won at Kinnick Stadium for the first time since 2005.

at Illinois

Source: Box Score

Illinois won for the first time in nine tries in the series. It was also former Iowa player and coach Bret Bielema's first game at Illinois against Iowa, as he missed the 2021 meeting due to issues relating to COVID-19.

at No. 2 Ohio State

Source: 

FOX’s Big Noon Kickoff was on hand for this matchup in Columbus. The score was competitive for most of the first half, but a pick six by Ohio State gave the Buckeyes a cushion heading into the break. After settling for three first half field goals, the Ohio State offense put up four second half touchdowns – TD passes from C. J. Stroud to four different receivers – to make this game a blowout. The Iowa offense turned the ball over six times and mustered just 158 yards and a field goal in what was the team's worst defeat since Kirk Ferentz’s Big Ten debut in 1999.

Northwestern

Source: Box Score

Northwestern had won three in a row at Kinnick Stadium, but the Hawkeyes responded with a 20-point win after a criticism-filled week leading up to the game. Freshman kicker Drew Stevens had a banner day by kicking four field goals, including a 54-yarder – the 5th-longest (by distance) in school history. These are the first back-to-back wins against the Wildcats since the 2014-2015 seasons.

at Purdue

Source: Box Score

Purdue had won four of the previous five in this series, but the Hawkeye defense held the Boilermaker offense 190 yards and 30 points below their averages. Entering the game, Purdue hadn’t scored fewer than 20 points in a game this season, and it was the first time Purdue didn’t score an offensive touchdown at home since 2013. Freshman running back Kaleb Johnson had 22 carries for 200 yards that included a 75-yard TD run, earning him B1G Offensive Player of the Week and B1G Freshman of the Week honors.

Wisconsin

Source: Box Score

Iowa recaptured the Heartland Trophy in a game where Wisconsin rarely threatened.

at Minnesota

Source: Box Score

Iowa won for the eighth consecutive time against the Gophers, building on its longest streak in the rivalry. After jumping out to a 10–0 first quarter lead, Iowa gave up over 300 yards rushing but forced two huge 4th quarter turnovers. Senior Jack Campbell had 10 tackles, a forced fumble, and an interception to earn B1G Defensive Player of the Week honors. Freshman Drew Stevens kicked his second field goal of the game to seal the win.

Nebraska

Source: Box Score

The Cornhuskers defeated Iowa for the first time in eight tries, in what was Kirk Ferentz’s 300th game as head coach of the Hawkeyes. This prevented Iowa from winning the Big Ten West Division and thus a berth in the 2022 Big Ten Championship Game.

vs. Kentucky (Music City Bowl)

Source: Box Score

All the scoring came in the second quarter as Luke Lachey caught a 15-yard pass from Joey Labas and the secondary delivered two pick sixes – first from Xavier Nwankpa for 52 yards followed by Cooper DeJean for 14 yards. Kirk Ferentz earned his 10th bowl victory in this rematch of a bowl game from the year prior.

Awards and honors

References

Iowa
Iowa Hawkeyes football seasons
Music City Bowl champion seasons
2022 in sports in Iowa